The 1991 NCAA Division III women's basketball tournament was the tenth annual tournament hosted by the NCAA to determine the national champion of Division III women's collegiate basketball in the United States.

St. Thomas (MN) defeated Muskingum in the championship game, 73–55, to claim the Tommies' first Division III national title. 

The championship rounds were hosted by the University of St. Thomas in Saint Paul, Minnesota.

Format
There was a slight adjustment to the tournament's format in 1991, even though the field size remained fixed at 32 teams.

The bracket was reorganized from eight regional tournaments of four teams, with each regional winner advancing to the national quarterfinal round, to a new structure of four sectionals of eight teams. Under the new format, the four sectional champions advanced to the national semifinal, or Final Four, round.

Bracket

Final Four

All-tournament team
 Tonja Englund, St. Thomas (MN)
 Laurie Trow, St. Thomas (MN)
 Michelle Snow, Muskingum
 Kate Titus, Muskingum
 Bernice Laferriere, Eastern Connecticut State

See also
 NCAA Women's Division III Basketball Championship
 1991 NCAA Division I women's basketball tournament
 1991 NCAA Division II women's basketball tournament
 1991 NCAA Division III men's basketball tournament
 NAIA Women's Basketball Championships

References

 
NCAA Division III women's basketball tournament
1991 in sports in Minnesota